Manila's at-large congressional district may refer to three occasions when a city-wide or provincewide at-large district was used for elections to the various Philippine national legislatures from Manila.

From 1898 to 1901, four representatives from the province of Manila who were elected at-large sat in the Malolos Congress, the National Assembly of the First Philippine Republic. The city and province were separated in 1901 with both electing their representatives from two districts each. From 1943 to 1944, the city of greater Manila as a whole sent two representatives to the National Assembly of the Second Philippine Republic. Multiple district representation was restored in the city in 1945. In 1978, regional at-large assembly districts were created for the national parliament with Manila included in the 21-seat Region IV's at-large district. The city returned to its own single multi-member at-large district in 1984 with a six-seat delegation for the Regular Batasang Pambansa of the Fourth Philippine Republic.

After 1986, Manila elected its representatives from its six congressional districts.

Representation history

See also
Legislative districts of Manila

References

Former congressional districts of the Philippines
Politics of Manila
1898 establishments in the Philippines
1901 disestablishments in the Philippines
1943 establishments in the Philippines
1944 disestablishments in the Philippines
1984 establishments in the Philippines
1986 disestablishments in the Philippines
At-large congressional districts of the Philippines
Congressional districts of Metro Manila
Constituencies established in 1898
Constituencies disestablished in 1901
Constituencies established in 1943
Constituencies disestablished in 1944
Constituencies established in 1984
Constituencies disestablished in 1986